Sekhar V. Joseph is a cinematographer in the Tamil and Telugu film industries. He is known for his collaborations with Gunasekhar and P. Vasu.

Filmography

Awards
 Nandi Award for Best Cinematographer - Okkadu (2003)

References

Living people
Tamil film cinematographers
Telugu film cinematographers
Year of birth missing (living people)